Archicnephasia is a genus of moths belonging to the subfamily Tortricinae of the family Tortricidae. It contains only one species, Archicnephasia hartigi, which is found in Italy.

Adults are on wing in late autumn.

Etymology
The species is named for Friedrich Reichsgraf von Hartig.

See also
List of Tortricidae genera

References

External links
Tortricidae.com

Cnephasiini
Monotypic moth genera
Moths of Europe
Taxa named by Józef Razowski
Tortricidae genera